The 1984 NCAA Division I softball season, play of college softball in the United States organized by the National Collegiate Athletic Association (NCAA) at the Division I level, began in February 1984.  The season progressed through the regular season, many conference tournaments and championship series, and concluded with the 1984 NCAA Division I softball tournament and 1984 Women's College World Series.  The Women's College World Series, consisting of the eight remaining teams in the NCAA Tournament and held in Omaha, Nebraska at Seymour Smith Park, ended on May 29, 1984.

Conference standings

Women's College World Series
The 1984 NCAA Women's College World Series took place from May 23 to May 29, 1984 in Omaha, Nebraska.

Season leaders
Batting
Batting average: .428 – Mary Wallace, Adelphi Panthers
RBIs: 43 – Michelle Turk, Penn State Nittany Lions
Home runs: 11 – Karen Nichols, Nicholls Colonels

Pitching
Wins: 33-7 – Lisa Ishikawa, Northwestern Wildcats
ERA: 0.09 (2 ER/147.0 IP) – Terri Higgins, Adelphi Panthers
Strikeouts: 469 – Lisa Ishikawa, Northwestern Wildcats

Records
NCAA Division I single game putouts:
35 – Laura Meyers, Cal Poly Pomona Broncos; May 24, 1984 (25 innings)

Junior class single game runs:
6 – Terri Tucker, Adelphi Panthers; April 9, 1984

Freshman class single game innings pitched:
25.0 – Shawn Andaya, Texas A&M Aggies; May 24, 1984

Junior class scoreless innings streak:
102.0 – Debbie Doom, UCLA Bruins; February 24-April 6, 1984

Freshman class no-hitters:
5 – Lisa Ishikawa, Northwestern Wildcats

Freshman class WHIP:
0.39 (30 H+15 BB/115.0 IP) – Shelley Berube, Florida State Seminoles

Junior class ERA:
0.10 (3 ER/215.1 IP) – Debbie Doom, UCLA Bruins

Team ERA:
0.10 (10 ER/397.0 IP) – UCLA Bruins

Awards
Honda Sports Award Softball:
Debbie Doom, UCLA Bruins

References